Bertho Driever (born 1953) is a recorder player.

He studied physics at the Utrecht University and music at the Sweelinck Conservatory in Amsterdam. In 1978, together with Daniël Brüggen, Paul Leenhouts, and Karel van Steenhoven, he founded the Amsterdam Loeki Stardust Quartet
.  He currently teaches at Boswell-Bèta and worked at Radboud University Nijmegen
.

References

External links 
 

1953 births
Living people
Dutch recorder players
Dutch performers of early music
People from Wageningen
Utrecht University alumni